Homer G. Balcom (February 16, 1870 – July 3, 1938) was a structural engineer who was responsible for designing the Empire State Building. Balcom was the most prominent consulting structural engineer in America after World War I (WWI).

Life and career
Balcom was born on February 16, 1870, in Chili, New York, the only child of Mahlon and Francis (Gage) Balcom. He earned his degree in civil engineering in 1897 from Cornell University.

Balcom married Gertrude McCrum. They had one daughter, Gertrude Marie. She often accompanied her father to engineering and social functions.

During World War I he volunteered to engineer steel ships for U.S. government at the Hog Island, Pennsylvania shipyards. Because of his contributions, 122 military vessels were built for the war effort at Hog Island, the most of any shipyard by a wide margin.

Although most of his notable works are in USA he also designed buildings outside of the US. Examples include the Louvain University Library in Belgium, Devonshire House in London and YMCA's building in Jerusalem.

Balcom died July 3, 1938, at age 68. He had checked into the hospital four days earlier for a heart ailment. Masonic funeral services were held at his residence, 65 Calumet Avenue, Hasting-on-Hudson, and afterward he was buried at Sleepy Hollow Cemetery, Tarrytown, New York.

Legacy
In 1996, the ASCE Metropolitan Section (ASCE/Metro) established the Homer Gage Balcom Award: "To be presented to an individual who has demonstrated a lifetime of excellence in the structural engineering of buildings, along with advances in the state-of-the-art and a commitment to the advancement of the structural engineering profession."

List of buildings

Empire State Building
David McCullough Bridge
Rockefeller Center Plaza
GE Building 
Waldorf-Astoria Hotel
Nebraska State Capitol

See also
Engineering Legends
Fazlur Rahman Khan

References

1870 births
1938 deaths
American civil engineers
American structural engineers
People from Chili, New York
Engineers from New York (state)